Afrisong is a solo piano album by Muhal Richard Abrams which was released on India Navigation and the Japanese Trio/Whynot label and features seven performances by Abrams recorded in Chicago in September 1975.

Reception
The Allmusic review states: "Muhal Richard Abrams seamlessy blended elements of stride, bebop, blues, and free music on this collection of solo piano pieces.... It was also a chance for Abrams to display his instrumental facility and underrated keyboard skills, which often take a back seat to his arranging, compositions and bandleading."The Rolling Stone Jazz Record Guide said the album "contains the best of his early solo work".

Track listing 
All compositions by Muhal Richard Abrams
 "Afrisong" – 5:03
 "The Infinite Flow" – 5:55
 "Peace On You" – 7:35
 "Hymn to the East" – 4:30
 "Roots" – 3:56
 "Blues For M." – 3:44
 "The New People" – 10:11
 Recorded at Universal Recording Studios, Chicago, on September 9, 1975

Personnel 
 Muhal Richard Abrams – piano

References 

1976 albums
Muhal Richard Abrams albums
India Navigation albums
Whynot Records albums
Solo piano jazz albums